The Ridgefield Gazook was a 4-page newsletter written and illustrated by the artist Man Ray. It only appeared for a single issue, (numbered 0), dated 31 March 1915. Ray lived in an artists colony in Ridgefield, New Jersey.

The only copy has been lost. Ray's biographer Arturo Schwarz described the Ridgefield Gazook as "America's first proto-Dada periodical".

References

Lost literature
1915 establishments in New Jersey
1915 disestablishments in New Jersey
Dada
Publications established in 1915
Publications disestablished in 1915
Newsletters